Voshilovo is a rural locality (a village) in Aserkhovskoye Rural Settlement, Sobinsky District, Vladimir Oblast, Russia. The population was 5 as of 2010.

Geography 
Voshilovo is located 18 km southeast of Sobinka (the district's administrative centre) by road. Aserkhovo is the nearest rural locality.

References 

Rural localities in Sobinsky District